Yang Jian or Jian Yang may refer to:

Historical figures
Emperor Wen of Sui (541–604), personal name Yang Jian, founder and emperor of the Sui dynasty
Yang Jian (Sui prince) (585–618), Sui dynasty prince and Emperor Wen's grandson
Yang Jian (Song dynasty) (died 1121), Song dynasty eunuch politician

Sportspeople
Yang Jian (rower) (born 1981), Chinese rower
Yang Jian (footballer) (born 1988), Chinese footballer
Yang Jian (diver) (born 1994), Chinese diver

Others
Erlang Shen, personal name Yang Jian, a mythological Chinese God
Jian Yang (politician) (born  1961), China-born New Zealand politician
Jian Yang (geneticist), statistical geneticist, Ruth Stephens Gani Medalist

See also
Yangjian, a town in Wuxi, Jiangsu, China
Yang Jiang (1911–2016), Chinese dramatist, writer, and translator